Elisa Maza is a fictional character and the main human character on the Disney animated television series Gargoyles, voiced by American actress Salli Richardson. In the series, she is an NYPD detective who is the steadfast ally (and honorary member) of the titular gargoyles' Manhattan Clan.

Elisa has an especially close relationship with the gargoyle Goliath, the clan's leader (a subject originally evaded by both of them and left deliberately ambiguous for over two seasons). She also serves as the clan's guide to the modern world as well as its voice of reason, often curbing the irrational impulses of its members.

Character design
The character of a strong, female human lead was a part of the Gargoyles universe's conception since the development of Goliath as the gargoyle protagonist. Much as the series' billionaire industrialist and original antagonist, David Xanatos began as a descendant or reincarnation of the prototypical Avalon Clan, Magus or Archmage character (evolving into a Greek-American character from Maine), Elisa was originally conceived as the reincarnation of the character that would later become the Avalon Clan's human leader, Princess Katharine. This idea did not last, but the character endured as a potential love interest and equal for Goliath. Elisa's preferred attire comprises a dark red jacket, black T-shirt, and tight jeans with back pockets.

Elisa had originally been designed as an Hispanic woman with the surname of Chavez. When Salli Richardson was cast as Elisa's voice actor, the character's race and ethnicity was adapted to match hers; Elisa became half-African American and half-Native American, which suited the show's allegory of human intolerance for gargoyles representing racial prejudice. Her last name was changed to Maza, which the creators believed to be a Sioux word for "iron" (it does come from Mázasapa (lit. "black metal"), the Miniconjou-Lakota/Sioux word for "iron"), and which suited the character's strong will. The name Chavez was later used for Elisa's police captain.

Characteristics
Elisa is of mixed heritage, Nigerian American descent on her mother's side ("The Mark of the Panther"), and Native American (mostly, but not exclusively, Hopi, and her family name, "Maza", indicating Miniconjou-Lakota-Sioux roots) on her father's side, ("Cloud Fathers") though she-herself is a born-&-bred New-Yorker. She is tall and athletic, as well as quick-witted, and she can hold her own against almost any adversary, though she is often impulsive.

A stand-out moment of her quick-thinking occurred when Broadway turned to stone when caught in midair at sunrise while fighting the robot double of Macbeth. With only a few seconds to save Broadway and obviously unable to catch him herself without being crushed, Elisa fired at the cable of a nearby crane to make it spill its cargo of crated rugs in order to create a soft landing for the gargoyle. The following night, Goliath praised her as a miracle for accomplishing such an astounding feat to save Broadway ("The Price").

Elisa doesn't take anything at face value, and accepts the beauty within, which is one reason she accepted the gargoyles as quickly as she did. She is down-to-earth and skeptical of certain things before she sees them with her own eyes, despite all the strange happenings that have occurred in her life. She is kindhearted and strong-willed and, like the gargoyles, tends to put the needs of others before herself.

However, Elisa does have her flaws as well; she can be stubborn, and has acted selfishly when it came to telling trusted friends and family members about the gargoyles, wanting to keep them to herself. She tried for a long time to ignore her true feelings for Goliath, which caused some heartache for both of them. Nevertheless, she always does the right thing in the end.

Fictional biography and relationships
A Detective Second Grade in the NYPD 23 precinct, Elisa first encountered the gargoyles when investigating a series of disturbances in the castle atop the skyscraper of billionaire David Xanatos. The sudden appearance of Goliath while she was snooping around shocked her into falling over the battlements, and he swooped down to rescue her. The two developed a bond almost immediately, at first connecting by their shared duty to "protect and serve", and an attraction grew over time. This soon made Elisa the avowed enemy of Goliath's ex-mate, Demona, who first "met" Elisa when the latter thwarted Demona's attempt on Goliath's life.

Elisa largely dubbed herself the protector of the protectors, although on a number of occasions she did display a certain unwillingness to share her secret (the existence of gargoyles) with anyone else, even her friends and family. She convinced the clan to leave the home of David Xanatos and move into the clock tower above the police station where she works. She then did everything she could to make them feel at home, bringing them food and even supplying a television set and old recliner chair. It was in part due to Elisa's role as a police detective that the Manhattan Clan realized what their new role was in the world, as they then dedicated themselves to defending the citizens of Manhattan.

Elisa is most closely associated with Goliath. Her relationship with the noble gargoyle, despite their different species, was the series' backbone, and Hudson noticed it building as early as in the episode "Awakening: Part 3". Despite this, the relationship was never rushed: for much of the series, only Demona, Goliath's estranged and genocidal former lover, behaved as though aware of the unspoken tie between Elisa and Goliath. Demona's jealousy and hatred for humanity would lead her to fixate upon Elisa. A major turning point in the series was the episode "The Mirror". In this episode, a magic spell briefly transforms Elisa into a gargoyle. Elisa, who by this time has realized her own feelings for Goliath, sees this as the destruction of the only barrier preventing their relationship. For Goliath (himself briefly turned into a human later in the episode), the transformation is all he needs to finally understand that he also harbors romantic feelings for Elisa. He says at one point, "I never realized before how beautiful you are." However, after Elisa playfully counters about the prospect that she was ugly as a human, Goliath nervously changes the subject back to their flight lesson in progress. Though at the end of the episode, both give evidence of awareness of the other's feelings; but while Goliath tries to talk to Elisa, she cuts him off just before the sun rises stating, after he is changed into stone, "...that's the way it is." In the final arc of the show's second season, "Hunter's Moon", Elisa begins a relationship with her newly assigned partner on the police force, Jason Conover, little realizing that he is in fact Jason Canmore, a Hunter. Goliath's pain and jealousy when he learns this is palpable, but he forces himself not to act on it, and Elisa herself breaks the relationship off because "There's someone... who comes first." At the end of the episode, Elisa and Goliath finally admit their feelings to each other, and share their first kiss. In the comics, after breaking up with him because she wants children and insisting that he date Delilah, Elisa realizes that she loves Goliath and can't stand to lose him. As Goliath lies severely injured from one of Thailog's attacks, they both say that they love each other and kiss.

Though Elisa is closest to Goliath, she has an effect on every gargoyle in the Manhattan Clan. It is Elisa that convinces Goliath's mentor to choose his own name Hudson, after the river —an act that is soon followed by the rest of the clan. Elisa is also supportive of Lexington's technological curiosity, providing many of the gizmos that he tinkered with. She even seemed to impress Brooklyn, who was slower than the others to forgive humans for the Wyvern Massacre. Besides Goliath, though, she seemed to make closest friends with Broadway. On several occasions, Broadway would arrive at Elisa's apartment unannounced. He showed an unparalleled interest in Elisa's police work, mostly because of detective movies that he had seen, joining her as her "partner" sometimes even without telling her first (such as in "the Silver Falcon"). Despite this, he always managed to come through for her in the end. Broadway's relationship with Elisa was the focus of the episode "Deadly Force", which stresses the importance of gun safety: Broadway finds and plays with Elisa's gun, and he ends up accidentally shooting Elisa, nearly killing her. Broadway's guilt after this incident leads him to eschew all use of firearms (and Elisa is later shown taking far more precautions about her use of guns as well).

Demona harbors, out of nearly the entire human race, the greatest resentment for Elisa, given her position in Goliath's (love) life; several of Demona's schemes include a plan for dealing specifically with Maza, either eliminating her outright or attempting to cause Goliath's trust in her to falter. Despite Demona's greater physical abilities and keen mind, Elisa has always stood up to the gargoyle, selflessly placing herself between her friends (the Manhattan clan) and the threat at hand. Finally, during the Avalon saga of the series, Elisa comes to meet and befriend Goliath's daughter, Angela, who is delighted to have a woman to converse with in the predominantly male clan. Elisa often functions as Angela's confidante, giving advice about various things and providing the same care and trust she gives to the rest of the clan. They grow especially close when Eliza saves Angela's life; giving her mouth to mouth resuscitation and compressing Angie's chest.

Elisa's upbringing in a multiracial household may have made her more open-minded when befriending the gargoyles, and particularly in her relationship with Goliath. Elisa is the eldest of three children born to Peter Maza, a retired NYPD sergeant of American Indian ethnicity, and his wife Diane, an African-American of Nigerian descent and an anthropologist specializing in the African culture. Elisa's siblings are her brother Derek (a.k.a. Talon) and her sister Beth.

Elisa's family became more and more important as the series progressed, exploring each member's background in greater detail. Elisa and Derek both became police officers like their father, Derek somewhat ambivalently, whereas Beth followed more in her mother's footsteps, becoming an anthropologist, albeit specializing in her father's Native American heritage. Beth goes to university in Flagstaff, Arizona, while Diane would spend time in Nigeria and became a village griot in order to get in touch with her roots. Elisa's relationship with her brother became problematic when Derek was enticed to quit the police force and work for David Xanatos, stubbornly refusing to believe his sister's warnings about the industrialist's amoral ruthlessness. The incident of Derek paying the price of that naivetè, when he was manipulated by Xanatos through being mutated into a winged pantherine humanoid by the amoral geneticist Anton Sevarius, proved most troubling for Elisa (literally bringing her to tears) and her deepest grievance with the villain. By the conclusion of the episode "The Cage", however, Elisa and her family come to accept Derek's pantherine form as Talon, along with a beginnings of a romantic relationship with Maggie Reed, likewise given a similar winged felinoid form earlier by Sevarius.

The relationship with her mother, Diane Maza, is a bit strained at first. This is easily seen in the beginning of the episode "Mark of the Panther", of the "Avalon World Tour" story arc. She is irritated by her mother's questions about her whereabouts during the Avalon World Tour and frustrated at Diane's inquiries of her well-being. At the end of the episode, Elisa learns to appreciate her mother more after realizing that Angela wishes for Goliath to show the same attitude Diane displays towards Elisa. After meeting with Goliath and talking to him about how to deal with Angela, Diane finally approves of his and the other gargoyles' presences in Elisa's life and comes to terms with the fact Elisa can live her own life. The episode "Cloud Fathers" explored Peter's background, and revealed that he and his father, Carlos Maza, had both taken part in a Kachina ritual in their youth. The ritual had specifically Hopi or possibly Zuni overtones (general consensus is that Peter's ancestors are largely, but not exclusively, Hopi). One of Oberon's children, Coyote, who is a revered figured in Native American mythology, took on the appearance of first a kachina dancer and then Peter in his youth in order to approach him. Likely this background may have made Peter more open to a relationship with Diane. This distinction helps tie Elisa even closer to her father: Peter's background and its influence on his choice of wife mirrors that affect that Elisa's own background had on her relationship with Goliath.

Reception
In 2009, Elisa was ranked as sixth on the Retro Junk's list of top cartoon women of the 1990s. In 2011, she was included on UGO.com's list of "the fifty imaginary women that really need to be brought to life by science somehow", called "one of the hottest female supporting characters in animation history." The character design of Detective Ellen Yin from The Batman is an homage to her. In 2015, Elisa received Honorable Mention (with Goliath) in WatchMojo.com's Top 10 Interspecies couples.

References

External links
 Elisa Maza at International Superheroes
 Elisa Maza at  Gargoyles Wiki

Animated human characters
Black characters in animation
Fictional African-American people
Fictional Pueblo people
Fictional characters from New York City
Television characters introduced in 1994
Fictional New York City Police Department detectives
Gargoyles (TV series) characters
Female characters in animated series
Animated characters introduced in 1994
Fictional Native American women